The "Weimar Triangle" is, loosely, a grouping of France, Germany, and Poland. The group is intended to promote co-operation between the three countries in crisis zones. It exists mostly in the form of summit meetings between the leaders of these three countries, and of their foreign ministers. The most recent summit of leaders occurred in Berlin on 8 February 2022. Previous meetings took place in Warsaw (2011), Poznań, Poland (1998), Nancy, France (1999), Hambach, Germany (2001) and Nancy, France (2005). The summits of Foreign Ministers have been more regular, running at least through 2016.

At the 2011 summit hosted by President Bronisław Komorowski of Poland and attended by President Nicolas Sarkozy (France) and Chancellor Angela Merkel (Germany), the heads of state discussed issues of renewing regular Weimar Triangle meetings, the Egyptian situation and improving relations with Russia (among other topics). Both Germany and France urged Poland to join the pact for competitiveness.

History 

The Weimar Triangle was established in the German city of Weimar in 1991, aimed at assisting Poland's emergence from Communist rule. Attending the meeting were the Foreign Ministers of each state: Roland Dumas of France, Hans-Dietrich Genscher of Germany, and Krzysztof Skubiszewski of Poland. Genscher chose Weimar for the inaugural meeting because it was situated in former East Germany.

At the 1992 meeting of the Weimar Triangle in France, Poland won agreement from Germany and France that it should have special association status at the Western European Union, the European arm of NATO.

On 5 July 2011, France, Germany, and Poland signed an agreement in Brussels to put together a unit of 1,700 soldiers, called the Weimar Battlegroup, that will be ready to deploy in crisis zones starting in 2013. The EU business newsletter reports that Poland will command the group, providing the core combat troops and a mechanised battalion, Germany will provide logistical support, and France will contribute medical support. The operational command centre will be based in Mont Valerien, located in a Paris suburb.

Shortly after the referendum on the status of Crimea held on 16 March 2014, the chairpersons of the Weimar Triangle parliament's committees on foreign affairs – Elisabeth Guigou of France, Norbert Röttgen of Germany and Grzegorz Schetyna of Poland – visited Kyiv to express their countries’ firm support of the territorial integrity and the European integration of Ukraine. This was the first time that parliamentarians of the Weimar Triangle had ever made a joint trip to a third country.

In April 2016, Poland's foreign minister Witold Waszczykowski told daily newspaper Gazeta Wyborcza that the Weimar Triangle had lost its relevance for his country.

On 28 August 2016, representatives of the three countries vowed to "reinvigorate" the Weimar Triangle. German foreign minister Frank-Walter Steinmeier said the group would meet before the end of 2016, and French foreign minister Jean-Marc Ayrault said France would host a summit in November 2016. The stated reasoning for this reinvigoration were the decision of the United Kingdom to leave the European Union, as well as the ongoing European migrant crisis.

On 8 February 2022, the meeting between Presidents Emmanuel Macron, Andrzej Duda and Chancellor Olaf Scholz took place in Berlin to discuss security cooperation in the face of the ongoing Russo-Ukrainian crisis. This was the first such trilateral meeting between the three heads of states in many years and was seen as a step towards strengthening the Weimar Triangle format. At a joint press conference President Duda appealed for unity among European leaders saying that "We must show that we speak in one voice". The German Chancellor stressed that any violation of Ukraine's sovereignty and territorial integrity was "unacceptable" and would have "far-reaching consequences for Russia in political, economic and geo-strategic dimensions" while President Macron reinforced France's determination to use diplomatic efforts which he said were "the only path to end the conflict around Ukraine."

Summits of foreign ministers

 28–29 August 1991 in Weimar, Germany
 23–24 April 1992 in Bergerac, France
 11–12 November 1993 in Warsaw, Poland
 14–15 September 1994 in Bamberg, Germany
 26 October 1995 in Paris, France
 19 December 1996 in Warsaw, Poland
 19 November 1997 in Frankfurt/Oder, Germany
 6 January 1999 in Paris, France
 30 August 1999 in Weimar, Germany
 7 June 2000 in Kraków, Poland
 16 January 2002 in Paris, France
 15 May 2004 in Berlin, Germany
 27 June 2005 in Nancy, France
 2005 in Warsaw, Poland
 June 2008 in Paris, France
 June 2009 in Weimar, Germany
 26–27 April 2010 in Bonn, Germany
 20 May 2011 in Bydgoszcz, Poland
 29 February 2012 in Berlin, Germany
 23 June 2012 in Warsaw, Poland
 31 March-1 April 2014 in Berlin and Weimar, Germany
 3 April 2015 in Wrocław, Poland
 28–29 August 2016 in Weimar and Berlin, Germany
 15 October 2020 in Paris, France
 10 September 2021 in Weimar, Germany
 1 March 2022 in Łódź, Poland

Summits of heads of state

 21 September 1993 in Gdańsk, Poland
 21 February 1998 in Poznań, Poland
 7 May 1999 in Nancy, France
 27 February 2001 in Hambach, Germany.
 9 May 2003 in Wrocław, Poland. Held a few days before the referendum on the entry of Poland in the European Union.
 19 May 2005 in Nancy, France
 5 December 2006 in Mettlach, Germany
 7 February 2011 in Warsaw, Poland
 6 March 2013 in Warsaw, Poland. The meeting of leaders of Weimar Triangle and Visegrád Group
 8 February 2022 in Berlin, Germany. The meeting of President Emmanuel Macron, President Andrzej Duda and Chancellor Olaf Scholz was focused on the threat to Ukraine's sovereignty and territorial integrity from Russia.

Summit on 3 July 2006 in Weimar, Germany was postponed due to alleged indisposition of the Polish president Lech Kaczyński.

Summits of Defence Ministers
 25 July 2006 in Wieliczka, Poland
 18 December 2007 in Berlin, Germany

In March 2015, Germany's Minister of Defence Ursula von der Leyen hosted her counterparts Jean-Yves Le Drian of France and Tomasz Siemoniak of Poland to revive a meeting format intended to promote co-operation between the three countries in crisis zones; it was the first meeting between the Weimar Triangle defence ministers since 2007.

Summits of Ministers of European Affairs
 30 September 2015 in Paris, France

In January 2020, the ministers of European Affairs met again in Paris, where they discussed among other things the rule of law and the 10-year EU budget.  They also visited a special painting exhibit about Poland's history at The Louvre.

Joint meetings of the Committees on European Affairs
 14 November 2014 in Berlin, Germany
 2013 in Gdańsk, Poland
 2012 in Paris, France

See also
 Visegrád Group
 Benelux
 Lublin Triangle
Weimarer Dreieck - Komitee zur Förderung der Deutsch-Französisch-Polnischen Zusammenarbeit e.V.

References

Organizations established in 1991
Politics of Europe
France–Poland relations
Germany–Poland relations
France–Germany relations
History of Weimar
Bottom-up regional groups within the European Union